Sortal is a concept used by some philosophers in discussing issues of identity, persistence, and change. Sortal terms are considered a species of general term that are classified within the grammatical category of common or count nouns or count noun phrases. This is based on the claim that a perceptual link allows perceptual demonstrative thought if it enables sortal classification.

Overview 
The simplest property of a sortal is that it can be counted, i.e., can take numbers as modifiers. It can also be used with a definite or indefinite article. For example, "pea" is a sortal in the sentence "I want two peas", whereas "water" is not a sortal in the sentence "I want water". It cannot be applied to an object that does not permit arbitrary division. Countability is not the only criterion. Thus "red thing" in the sentence "There are two red things on the shelf" is not treated as a sortal by some philosophers who use the term. There is disagreement about the exact definition of the term as well as whether it is applied to linguistic things (such as predicates or words), abstract entities (such as properties or concepts), or psychological entities (such as states of mind).

Differing perspectives
According to the Stanford Encyclopedia of Philosophy, the sortal/nonsortal distinction can be characterized in at least six different ways. It is said that a sortal:

gives a criterion for counting the items of that kind
gives a criterion of identity and non-identity among items of that kind
gives a criterion for the continued existence of an item of that kind
answers the question "what is it?" for things of that kind
specifies the essence of things of that kind
does not apply to parts of things of that kind

History
While some philosophers have argued that the notion of a sortal is similar to that of the idea of a "secondary substance" in Aristotle, the first actual use of the term 'sortal' did not appear until John Locke in his 1690 Essay Concerning Human Understanding:

Gottlob Frege is also named as an antecedent to the present debate over sortals. Frege pointed out that in counting things, we need to know what kind of thing it is that we are counting; that is, there needs to be a "criterion of identity".

In contemporary philosophy, sortals make a return with the work of P. F. Strawson, W. V. O. Quine, Peter Geach, and David Wiggins. Strawson holds that sortals are universals, Quine thinks they are predicates, and Wiggins sees them as concepts. Geach did not use the exact term "sortal"; however, his idea of the "substantival expression" is identical or nearly so to that of "sortal". According to him, identity is relative in a sortal concept, which he described as one that answers the question "Same what?".

See also
 Taxonomy (general)

References

Further reading
 E. J. Lowe. More Kinds of Being: A Further Study of Individuation, Identity, and the Logic of Sortal Terms (Wiley-Blackwell, 2009)

John Locke